Olearia chrysophylla is a species of flowering plant in the family Asteraceae and is endemic to eastern Australia. It is a shrub with scattered elliptic leaves, and white and yellow, daisy-like inflorescences.

Description
The upper surface of the leaves is glabrous but the lower surface is covered with felt-like, pale brown hairs. Each head has four to seven white ray florets surrounding twelve to fourteen yellow disc florets. Flowering occurs from November to January and the fruit is a glabrous achene, the pappus with 73 to 85 bristles in two rows.

Taxonomy
This daisy bush was first formally described in 1836 by Augustin Pyramus de Candolle who gave it the name Eurybia chrysophylla in his Prodromus Systematis Naturalis Regni Vegetabilis. In 1867 George Bentham changed that name to Olearia chrysophylla in Flora Australiensis. The specific epithet (chrysophylla) means "golden-leaved".

Distribution and habitat
Olearia chrysophylla grows in forest, usually at higher altitudes from south-east Queensland to the New England National Park in New South Wales, sometimes as far inland as Jenolan Caves and Bathurst.

References

chrysophylla
Flora of Queensland
Flora of New South Wales
Taxa named by Augustin Pyramus de Candolle
Plants described in 1836